World Gospel Mission (WGM) is an interdenominational Christian holiness missionary agency headquartered in Marion, Indiana, United States. Aligned with the Wesleyan Holiness tradition of Protestantism, WGM was founded on 10 June 1910 in University Park, Iowa as the Missionary Department of the National Association for the Promotion of Holiness. As of 2018, WGM operates in 23 countries and supports 236 full-time missionaries, in addition to short-term team members and volunteers.

About
World Gospel Mission uses the faith mission approach. Therefore, all missionaries (short-term or long-term) and volunteers with WGM are responsible for raising their own financial support with the help of the organization. Missionaries raise the funds needed to pay for salaries, housing, medical and life insurance, children’s educations, and retirement.

WGM is a charter member of the Evangelical Council for Financial Accountability (ECFA) and is affiliated with the Evangelical Fellowship of Missions Agencies (EFMA), the Standards of Excellence in Short-Term Mission, Samaritan’s Purse, and several other non-profits.

WGM’s areas of service include church ministries, children’s and youth ministries, educational ministries, medical ministries, support ministries, sports ministries, and humanitarian ministries.

Along with mobilizing volunteers and missionaries, WGM provides a list of Projects, which are crowdfunded opportunities that correspond to needs in specific locations.

History
At the instigation of Mrs. Iva May Durham Vennard (1871–1945), a Methodist evangelist and later founder and first president of the Chicago Evangelistic Institute (now Vennard College), and the support of Holiness Association president, Rev. Charles J. Fowler, the Missionary Department of the National Association for the Promotion of Holiness was established at University Park, Iowa on 10 June 1910, with the specific purpose of "spreading scriptural holiness to the ends of the earth." Rev. Cecil Warren Troxel and his wife, Ellen Armour Troxel (born 1875), and the Rev. Woodford Taylor and his wife, Mrs. Harriet Armour Taylor, members of the Free Methodist Church of North America, became the first missionaries in China with the Missionary Department of the National Association for the Promotion of Holiness, directly under the Christian Holiness Association (now Christian Holiness Partnership). WGM remained active primarily in China over the next decade, eventually expanding to other fields.

By 1919 the headquarters was located at 825 Woodbine Avenue, Oak Park, Illinois. After a number of moves in the Chicago area, the headquarters relocated permanently to Marion, Indiana in a former YMCA building at Fifth and Boots Street. In the same year, the first edition of WGM’s print magazine Call to Prayer (now The Call) was published as a bi-monthly subscription. The Call is still produced and available for free in print or digital form.

In 1926 the Mission became incorporated in Illinois as a separate legal entity from the National Holiness Association and was renamed as the Missionary Society for the Promotion of Holiness. The name was changed to World Gospel Mission in 1954.

By 1975, the headquarters had moved from downtown Marion to a newly built campus a few miles east, where it remains today.

Programs
WGM offers short, mid, and long-term missions experiences.
 Short-term
Short-term trips typically last between 1–2 weeks. Volunteers may go on short-term trips as a team, or individuals can join pre-planned team trips designated for certain locations.
 Mid-term
Mid-term trips can last between 1–12 months. Volunteers choose a location of service based on need and their own ministry specialty.
 Long-term
Long-term missionaries are on the field for 2 or more years. Long-term opportunities require a longer application process and more involved training.

Locations
World Gospel Mission missionaries and volunteers are active in over 25 locations.

 Africa
 Burundi
 Kenya
 South Sudan
 Uganda

 Asia
 Cambodia
 India
 Japan

 Europe
 Albania
 Czech Republic
 Hungary
 Spain

 Middle East
 Unspecified

 North/Central America
 American Indian Field
 Guatemala
 Haiti
 Honduras
 Mexico
 Stockton, CA
 Texas/Mexico Border
 USA Ministries

 Oceania
 Papua New Guinea

 South America
 Argentina
 Bolivia
 Paraguay
 Peru

References

Sources and further reading
Bushong, Burnis H[arvey]. The Best of the Story: Miraculous Answers to Prayer. Marion, IN: World Gospel Mission, 1993.
Bushong, Burnis H[arvey]. R.U.N. Reaching the Unreached Now: A Brief History of World Gospel Mission. Marion, IN: World Gospel Mission, 1995.
Jones, Charles Edwin. The Wesleyan Holiness Movement: A Comprehensive Guide (ATLA Bibliography Series) 2 vols. Lanham, MD: Scarecrow, 2005. See pages 241–244 for bibliographic and prosographical details regarding WGM.
Troxel, Ellen Armour and Mrs. John Jacob Trachsel. Cecil Troxel – The Man and the Work: Missionary to China with the National Holiness Missionary Society from Its Inception. Chicago, IL: National Holiness Missionary Society, 1948.

Wesleyan Church
Christian missions
Christian organizations established in 1910
Christian organizations established in the 20th century
Marion, Indiana